Viburnum tinus, the laurustinus, laurustine or laurestine, is a species of flowering plant in the family Adoxaceae, native to the Mediterranean area of Europe and North Africa. Laurus signifies the leaves' similarities to bay laurel.

Description
The leaves are evergreen, persisting 2–3 years, ovate to elliptic, borne in opposite pairs, 4–10 cm long and 2–4 cm broad, fine hairs persisting on the underside, with an entire margin.

The flowers are small, white or light pink, produced from reddish-pink buds in dense cymes 5–10 cm diameter in the winter. The fragrant flowers (some consider the fragrance offensive, especially after rain when it is very strong) are bisexual (monoecious - having both male and female parts on one plant) and pentamerous. The flowering period is in winter, or from October to June in the northern hemisphere. The five petals are tubular, with rounded, corolla lobes, pink in the bud but later white. There is only one circle with five stamens. Pollination is by insects. The fruit is a dark blue-black drupe 5–7 mm long. A 2020 study of the fruit's metallic blue hue revealed  microscopic globules of fat to be the cause, an example of structural color, which is unusual in plants.

The leaves have domatia where predatory and microbivorous mites can be housed.

Distribution and Habitat
Native to the Mediterranean Region, Viburnum tinus prefers shady, moist areas. It is most commonly found in the western Mediterranean due to a shorter drought season and is one of the dominant species of Mediterranean sclerophyllous shrubland. It has also been introduced to Australia, Pakistan, California, Oregon and Tajikistan.

Cultivation
Viburnum tinus is widely cultivated for its winter blooms and metallic blue berries. The cultivars ‘Eve Price’, ‘French White’ and ‘Gwenllian’ have gained the Royal Horticultural Society’s Award of Garden Merit.

Other uses
V. tinus has been used for its traditional medicinal properties, for example in Pakistan. The active ingredients are viburnin (a substance or more probably a mixture of compounds) and tannins. Tannins can cause stomach upset. The leaves when infused have antipyretic properties. The fruits have been used as purgatives against constipation. The tincture has been used lately in herbal medicine as a remedy for depression. The plant also contains iridoid glucosides.

Pests
In south-east Britain  Viburnum tinus is the principal host of  the viburnum beetle (Pyrrhalta viburni), the  country's "number one pest species" according to the Royal Horticultural Society.

Etymology
The generic name of the plant derives from Latin  referring to Viburnum lantana. The specific name derives from Latin  referring to the plant itself, Viburnum tinus.

References

External links

 Flora Europaea: Viburnum tinus
Eriksson, O., et al. 1979. Flora of Macaronesia: checklist of vascular plants
 Pignatti S. - Flora d'Italia – Edagricole – 1982, Vol. II, pag. 639
 Biolib
 Viburnum tinus

Gallery

tinus
Flora of Europe
Flora of North Africa
Flora of Western Asia
Medicinal plants
Garden plants
Plants described in 1753
Taxa named by Carl Linnaeus